The Hamilton Lloyds were a Canadian junior ice hockey team. They played in the Ontario Hockey Association for the 1945–46 season, were based in Hamilton, Ontario, and played home games at the Barton Street Arena, also known as the Hamilton Forum. The Lloyds finished eighth place, and last in the league. The following year the team was renamed the Hamilton Szabos.

Four alumni from the Lloyds graduated to play in the National Hockey League, including Ray Frederick, Stephen Kraftcheck, Glen Sonmor, and Jack Stoddard.

Season-by-season results
Season-by-season results:

References

1945 establishments in Ontario
1946 disestablishments in Ontario
Ice hockey clubs established in 1945
Ice hockey teams in Hamilton, Ontario
Defunct Ontario Hockey League teams
Sports clubs disestablished in 1946